The 1978 Star World Championships were held in San Francisco, United States in 1978.

Results

References

1978 in sailing
Star World Championships in the United States